Events from the year 1977 in North Korea.

Incumbents
Premier: Pak Song-chol (until 19 December), Li Jong-ok (starting 19 December)
Supreme Leader: Kim Il-sung

Events
1977 North Korean parliamentary election

Births

 1 January - Kim Jong-su.
 2 September - O Song-suk.

See also
Years in Japan
Years in South Korea

References

 
North Korea
1970s in North Korea
Years of the 20th century in North Korea
North Korea